In humans and many other primates, the calcaneus (from the Latin calcaneus or calcaneum, meaning heel) or heel bone is a bone of the tarsus of the foot which constitutes the heel.  In some other animals, it is the point of the hock.

Structure
In humans, the calcaneus is the largest of the tarsal bones and the largest bone of the foot. Its long axis is pointed forwards and laterally. The talus bone, calcaneus, and navicular bone are considered the proximal row of tarsal bones. In the calcaneus, several important structures can be distinguished:

There is a large calcaneal tuberosity located posteriorly on plantar surface with medial and lateral tubercles on its surface. Besides, there is another peroneal tubercle on its lateral surface. On its lower edge on either side are its lateral and medial processes (serving as the origins of the abductor hallucis and abductor digiti minimi).  The Achilles tendon is inserted into a roughened area on its superior side and the cuboid bone articulates with its anterior side. On its superior side there are three articular surfaces for the articulation with the talus bone.  Between these superior articulations and the equivalents on the talus is the tarsal sinus (a canal occupied by the interosseous talocalcaneal ligament). At the upper and forepart of the medial surface of the calcaneus, below the middle talar facet, there is a horizontal eminence, the talar shelf (also sustentaculum tali). Sustentaculum tali gives attachment to the plantar calcaneonavicular (spring) ligament, tibiocalcaneal ligament, and medial talocalcaneal ligament. This eminence is concave above, and articulates with the middle calcaneal articular surface of the talus; below, it is grooved for the tendon of the flexor hallucis longus; its anterior margin gives attachment to the plantar calcaneonavicular ligament, and its medial margin to a part of the deltoid ligament of the ankle-joint.

On the lateral side is commonly a tubercle called the calcaneal tubercle (or trochlear process). This is a raised projection located between the tendons of the peroneus longus and brevis. It separates the two oblique grooves of the lateral surface of the calcaneus (for the tendons of the peroneal muscles).

Its chief anatomical significance is as a point of divergence of the previously common pathway shared by the distal tendons of peroneus longus and peroneus brevis en route to their distinct respective attachment sites.

The calcaneus is part of two joints: the proximal intertarsal joint and the talocalcaneal joint. The point of the calcaneus is covered by the calcanean bursa.

Development
In the calcaneus, an ossification center develops during the 4th–7th week of fetal development.

Function
Three muscles insert on the calcaneus: the gastrocnemius, soleus, and plantaris. These muscles are part of the posterior compartment of the leg and aid in walking, running and jumping. Their specific functions include plantarflexion of the foot, flexion of the knee, and steadying the leg on the ankle during standing. The calcaneus also serves as origin for several short muscles that run along the sole of the foot and control the toes.

Clinical significance

Normally the tibia sits vertically above the calcaneus (pes rectus). If the calcaneal axis between these two bones is turned medially the foot is in an everted position (pes valgus), and if it is turned laterally the foot is in an inverted position (pes varus).
 Calcaneal fracture, also known as Lover's fracture and Don Juan fracture

Disease

The talar shelf is typically involved in subtalar or talocalcaneal tarsal coalition.

See also 

 Calcar
 Bohler's angle
 Sanders classification

Additional images

Notes

References

External links

 
 3D printable calcaneus model, free download in STL format (Embodi3D.com)

Bones of the lower limb
Vertebrate anatomy
Bones of the foot
Tarsal bones